Aziz Aslimanesh (‎; 9 April 1938 – 23 April 2015) was an Iranian football goalkeeper, manager and actor. He played for Daraei F.C. and then joined Persepolis F.C. for the rest of his career. He also capped for Team Melli, where he was part of the team that won the Asian Cup in 1968.

He acted in many films in Iran before the Iranian Islamic Revolution, including Conquerors of the Desert (1971), Keshtye Noah (1968) and Never Without Love (1966).

Honours

Club
Daraei
 Tehran Football Championship: 1961–1962, 1962–63

Shahin
 Tehran Football Championship: 1965–66

International
Iran
 AFC Asian Cup: 1968

References

External links 
 
 Team Melli stats
 My Memories, written by Aziz Asli Manesh
 FIFA.COM 
 

Persepolis F.C. players
1938 births
Sportspeople from Tabriz
2015 deaths
Zob Ahan Esfahan F.C. managers
Footballers at the 1964 Summer Olympics
Olympic footballers of Iran
Asian Games silver medalists for Iran
Iranian footballers
Association football goalkeepers
German people of Azerbaijani descent
German people of Iranian descent
Asian Games medalists in football
Footballers at the 1966 Asian Games
Medalists at the 1966 Asian Games
1968 AFC Asian Cup players
Iranian football managers
German people of Iranian Azerbaijani descent
Iranian male actors